9q34 deletion syndrome  is a rare genetic disorder. Terminal deletions of chromosome 9q34 have been associated with childhood hypotonia, a distinctive facial appearance and developmental disability. The facial features typically described include arched eyebrows, small head circumference, midface hypoplasia, prominent jaw and a pouting lower lip. Individuals with this disease may often have speech impediments, such as speech delays. Other characteristics of this disease include: epilepsy, congenital and urogenital defects, microcephaly, corpulence, and psychiatric disorders. From analysis of chromosomal breakpoints, as well as gene sequencing in suggestive cases, Kleefstra and colleagues identified EHMT1 as the causative gene.
This gene is responsible for producing the protein histone methyltransferase which functions to alter histones. Ultimately, histone methyltransferases are important in deactivating certain genes, needed for proper growth and development. Moreover, a frameshift, missense, or nonsense error in the coding sequence of EHMT1 can result in this condition in an individual.

Signs and symptoms
Physical symptoms
 Heart defects
 Characteristics of autism
 Genital defects (in males)
 Childhood hypotonia
 Respiratory infections
 Motor delay
 Renal defects
 Severe delay or total lack of speech
 Happy disposition
 Dysmorphic facial features

Behavioural symptoms
 Passiveness
 Sociability
 Aggression
 Biting or hitting
 Moodiness
 Disliking routine changes

Genetics
Despite the associated effects of Kleefstra, there is insubstantial information regarding to the lethality of Kleefstra's. Most of the documented cases are de novo with the exception of one case due to hereditary factors; however, some cases may be a result of chromosomal translocations. In the exception case, the mother transferred the EHMT1 point mutation on to her child as she was a carrier of this gene defect. According to Mitter, et al. (2012), the mother's phenotype of the NM_024757.4:c.2712+1G>A mutation displayed mosaicism at certain tissues. This mutation resulted in the disregard of exon 18 on the EHMT1 gene, as opposed to removing it through the spliceosomes. In another transcript, however, an intron was placed between exon 18 and 19 of the EHMT1 gene. The combination of the intron insertion and the mosaicism in the mother was transferred to the child, resulting in the pathogenesis of the disease.

In the past, research showed that the austerity of the disease was directly proportional to the number of EHMT1 deletions prevalent in an individual. The greater the deletions, the greater the severity of the condition. However, in recent studies, 9q34 deletion syndrome occurs when the EHMT1 gene is non-functioning, as opposed to strictly deletion.

Diagnosis
Tests are either conducted at birth, or later in early childhood via: fluorescence in situ hybridization (FISH), multiplex ligation-dependent probe amplification (MLPA), array comparative genomic hybridization (aCGH), and EHMT1 sequencing.

FISH is a screening test that uses multicolour probes or comparative genomic hybridization to find any chromosome irregularities in a genome. It can be used for gene mapping, detecting aneuploidy, locating tumours etc. The multicolour probes attach to a certain DNA fragment. MLPA is a test that finds and records DNA copy change numbers through the use of PCR. MLPA can be used to detect tumours in the glial cells of the brain, as well as chromosomal abnormalities. Array-based comparative genomic hybridization (aCGH) tracks chromosome deletions and or amplifications using fluorescent dyes on genomic sequences of DNA samples. The DNA samples (which are 25-80 base pairs in length) are then placed on slides to be observed under microscope. Lastly, EHMT1 sequencing is a process in which a single-strand of DNA from the EHMT1 gene is removed, and DNA polymerase is added in order to synthesize complementary strands. In turn, this allows scientists to map out a person's DNA sequence allowing for a diagnosis to be made.

Treatment

Individual manifestations are treated by a multidisciplinary team.

Epidemiology
Kleefstra syndrome affects males and females equally and approximately 75% of all documented cases are caused by Eu-HMTase1 disruptions while only 25% are caused by 9q34.3 deletions. There are no statistics on the effect the disease has on life expectancy due to the lack of information available.

History
Kleefstra syndrome is a new condition that has only been known about for a few years and there have been fewer than 200 cases, reported. Due to the lack of cases worldwide, the history behind the origination is unclear.

Research
A study published by the American Journal of Human Genetics performed an EHMT1 mutation analysis on 23 patients that showed symptoms of 9q34 deletion syndrome. The patients all varied in age. With respect to all the analyses, however, the clinical data focused on five patients, the majority being children. The first patient developed epilepsy early on in childhood, and had speech problems past age 8. He had hypoplasia and had prominent facial features, such as lips and mouth. The second patient had no trace of mitral regurgitation (MR) in her family history, but had slight hypotonia. Patient three was the oldest at 36 who began to walk at age 3. She later gained weight at eleven and developed epilepsy in her late twenties. The fourth patient had problems associated with eating as a young child and was diagnosed with slowed development. Patient five had behavioural issues and struggled with MR in addition to being overweight. The geneticists discovered three new mutations within the EHMT1 gene. The first was an interstitial deletion, while the second and third were a nonsense and frameshift. Their findings supported the notion that a disruption in the EHMT1 gene contributes to the pathogenesis of Kleefstra syndrome.

In another study published by the Journal of Medical Genetics, DNA from forty patients were extracted and subjected to MLPA, FISH or EHMT1 sequencing. The forty patients were divided into two groups: 1 group of 16 patients with the 9q34 deletion, and 1 group of 24 with typical FISH/MPLA results. The geneticists examined how a missense mutation would affect the function of the DNA by looking at DNA models. After, they screened each person's DNA using one of three tests, the results for the first group showed six patients had the same deletion of the same size (700 kb). In the second group, after EHMT1 sequencing was performed, six intragenic mutations were discovered. The scientists investigating this experiment conclude these mutations may be infective agents for the disease. Lastly, the patients' behavioural, physical, and psychiatric symptoms are included on the data chart.

References

External links 

 The Genetics Home Reference website

Autosomal monosomies and deletions
Rare genetic syndromes
Syndromes with intellectual disability
Syndromes with craniofacial abnormalities
Syndromes affecting the jaw
Syndromes with microcephaly